Toamasina Ambalamanasy Airport is an airport in Toamasina, Atsinanana Region, Madagascar . The airport is located 5 km northwest of the city of Toamasina and is operated by the Aéroports de Madagascar Company (ADEMA S.A).

Airlines and destinations

References

Airports in Madagascar
Atsinanana